Margherita Carducci  (born 5 February 1997), known professionally as Ditonellapiaga, is an Italian singer-songwriter.

Biography
Carducci was born in Rome. Her music career began in 2017 when she started playing with artists in the Roman music scene such as Alessandro Casagni, Lorenzo Taddei, and Flavio Calogero. After deciding to create a project with her original music, she started working in 2019 with the Roman producer duo Bbprod, with whom she released the debut single "Parli".

In October 2020, she obtained a recording contract with the label Dischi Belli, part of the BMG Rights Management group, and released a cover of Matia Bazar's song "Per un'ora d'amore", followed by the single "Morphina" in December.

In February 2021, she released "Spreco di potenziale", which took shape in the Italian indie pop sphere, single that anticipated the release of the debut EP entitled "Morsi", out on 23 April. In the same year, the cover of "Per un'ora d'amore" was included in the soundtrack of the film Anni da cane by Fabio Mollo.

Her debut album, Camouflage, was released on 14 January 2022. She participated at the Sanremo Music Festival 2022 alongside Donatella Rettore, with the song "Chimica".

Discography

Studio albums 
 Camouflage (2022)

EPs 
 Morsi (2021)
 Morsi Remix (2021)

Singles 
 "Parli" (2019)
 "What About Us"  (2019)
 "Per un'ora d'amore" (2020)
 "Morphina" (2020)
 "Spreco di potenziale" (2021)
 "Non ti perdo mai" (2021)
 "Chimica" ( (2022)

References

Italian women singer-songwriters
Living people
21st-century Italian women singers
1997 births
Singers from Rome